Shirley Itumeleng Tiny Segokgo is a politician from Botswana. She is a member of the National Assembly of Botswana and also a member of the women's caucus. Segokgo is also a member of the Pan-African Parliament.

See also
 List of members of the Pan-African Parliament

References

Year of birth missing (living people)
Living people
Members of the National Assembly (Botswana)
Members of the Pan-African Parliament from Botswana
21st-century Botswana women politicians
21st-century Botswana politicians
Women members of the Pan-African Parliament